Johannes Virolainen (31 January 1914 – 11 December 2000) was a Finnish politician and who served as 30th Prime Minister of Finland. 

Virolainen was born near Viipuri. After the Continuation War Virolainen moved to Lohja, but he remained one of the leaders of the evacuated Karelians, and never gave up the hope that Soviet Union and later Russia would return Finnish Karelia to Finland. After World War II Virolainen became the first president of the Maaseudun Nuorten Liitto later known as Finnish Centre Youth, which has been educating tens of ministers and hundreds of members of the Finnish Parliament.

He was also famous as a teetotaller, saying that the only circumstance where he would countenance downing a toast would be if Karelia was ceded back to Finland. He was fond of repeating the line, and it has been claimed that he said it to, among others, Nikita Khrushchev and Anastas Mikoyan on the Soviet side, to fend off needling by them for lacking the Soviet style of social graces.

A member of the Agrarian League (later the Centre Party), Virolainen was a Member of Parliament 1945–1983 and 1987–1991.

He had a long ministerial career, serving as Assistant Minister of the Interior 1950–1951; Minister at the Council of State Chancellery 1951, and 1956–1957; Minister of Education 1953, 1954, 1956–1957, and 1968–1970; Minister of Foreign Affairs 1954–1956, 1957, and 1958; Deputy Prime Minister 1957, 1958, 1962–1963, 1968–1970, and 1977–1979; Minister of Agriculture 1961–1963; Minister of Finance 1972–1975; and Minister of Agriculture and Forestry 1976–1979.

Virolainen was Prime Minister from 1964–1966, presiding over a coalition government comprising the Centre Party, National Coalition Party, Swedish People's Party, and Finnish People's Party. He also served as Speaker of the Parliament from 1966–1968 and 1979–1983. Virolainen is considered one of the strongest Centre Party leaders in the post-war era, second only to Urho Kekkonen.

Virolainen had a variable, often tense relationship with President Kekkonen, who considered him an unreliable, too frequently opinion-changing politician (Juhani Suomi, "A Ski Trail Being Snowed In:  Urho Kekkonen 1976-1981" / Umpeutuva latu.  Urho Kekkonen 1976-1981, Helsinki:  Otava Publishing Ltd., 2000).  Virolainen himself claimed that the two basic reasons for their tense relationship were that he had never been a member of the right-wing, nationalist Academic Karelia Society (Kekkonen had, until 1932), and that he was a teetotaller (Kekkonen drank and at times smoked).  Moreover, Kekkonen was unconvinced that Virolainen always supported his official foreign policy toward the Soviet Union.  In June 1979, he publicly rebuked Virolainen, who was then Speaker of Parliament, for "bearing a false testimony" about Finland's foreign policy, and for harming Finland's international relations.  Shortly before this harsh accusation, Virolainen had suggested in an interview by the Suomen Kuvalehti magazine that the National Coalition Party had remained in the opposition despite its major victory in the 1979 parliamentary elections because of "general reasons" or foreign policy.

After Kekkonen resigned in October 1981, Virolainen became the Centre Party's presidential candidate, but he was handily defeated in the 1982 presidential elections by the Social Democratic candidate, Mauno Koivisto.  In the 1983 parliamentary elections, Virolainen was one of the major-party deputies to lose their seats because of allegations that he had illegally received the parliamentary daily allowance for commuting between Helsinki and his official hometown.  Determined to finish his parliamentary career in style, he was re-elected to Parliament in the 1987 parliamentary elections.  During his last electoral term, Virolainen supported constitutional amendment proposals that reduced the President's power.

During his nine-year retirement from Parliament, Virolainen still actively followed the Finnish political affairs and sometimes gave interviews on current topics (the Finnish broadcasting corporation YLE "Living Archives" / Elävä arkisto, search words:  "Johannes Virolainen").  He also wrote some volumes of political memoirs, including "A Defence of Politics" (Politiikan puolustus), "From the Path" (Polun varrelta), and "The Pictures Move" (Kuvat kulkevat).

Cabinets
 Virolainen Cabinet

References

1914 births
2000 deaths
People from Vyborg District
People from Viipuri Province (Grand Duchy of Finland)
Centre Party (Finland) politicians
Prime Ministers of Finland
Deputy Prime Ministers of Finland
Ministers of Education of Finland
Ministers for Foreign Affairs of Finland
Ministers of Finance of Finland
Speakers of the Parliament of Finland
Members of the Parliament of Finland (1945–48)
Members of the Parliament of Finland (1948–51)
Members of the Parliament of Finland (1951–54)
Members of the Parliament of Finland (1954–58)
Members of the Parliament of Finland (1958–62)
Members of the Parliament of Finland (1962–66)
Members of the Parliament of Finland (1966–70)
Members of the Parliament of Finland (1970–72)
Members of the Parliament of Finland (1972–75)
Members of the Parliament of Finland (1975–79)
Members of the Parliament of Finland (1979–83)
Members of the Parliament of Finland (1987–91)
Finnish military personnel of World War II